Annu Raj Singh (born 17 February 1984) is an Indian shooter from Aligarh. She along with Heena Sidhu won the gold medal in women's Pairs 10 metre air pistol at the 2010 Commonwealth Games.  At the 2012 Summer Olympics, she competed in both the 10 metre air pistol and the 25 metre pistol.

In South Asian games 2019, she won gold medal in Women's 25 meter pistol

Early life 
She was educated at Our Lady of Fatima High School, Aligarh and Aligarh Muslim University.

References

Living people
Commonwealth Games gold medallists for India
Indian female sport shooters
Shooters at the 2010 Commonwealth Games
Sportspeople from Aligarh
Aligarh Muslim University alumni
Medalists at the 2010 Asian Games
Asian Games medalists in shooting
Shooters at the 2010 Asian Games
Shooters at the 2012 Summer Olympics
1984 births
Commonwealth Games medallists in shooting
Sportswomen from Uttar Pradesh
21st-century Indian women
21st-century Indian people
Asian Games silver medalists for India
Olympic shooters of India
Recipients of the Arjuna Award
Medallists at the 2010 Commonwealth Games